The men's 200 metre freestyle event at the 2018 Asian Games took place on 19 August at the Gelora Bung Karno Aquatic Stadium.

During the medal ceremony, the flags of the three medalists crashed to the ground due to a technical malfunction. Sun Yang, the Chinese swimmer and the gold medalist of the event, immediately got off the podium, walked to some officials and demanded the medal ceremony to be conducted once again. The flags were re-attached to the broken hoist but couldn't be raised, and the Chinese anthem was played for a second time.

Schedule
All times are Western Indonesia Time (UTC+07:00)

Records

Results

Heats

Final

References

Swimming at the 2018 Asian Games